Cowdenbeath railway station served the town of Cowdenbeath, Fife, Scotland, from 1848 to 1919 on the Edinburgh and Northern Railway.

History 
The station was opened on 4 September 1848 by the Edinburgh and Northern Railway. On the east side was the goods yard. The day before the newer Cowdenbeath station opened, the station's name was changed to Cowdenbeath Old on 1 June 1890. A deviation line opened to serve the new station in 1900, rendering this station useless, thus it closed on 31 March 1919, although it still remained open to miners.

References 

Disused railway stations in Fife
Railway stations in Great Britain opened in 1848
Railway stations in Great Britain closed in 1919
1848 establishments in Scotland
1919 disestablishments in Scotland